John "Zeke" Bella (August 22, 1930 – November 17, 2013) was a Major League Baseball outfielder who appeared in 52 total games for the New York Yankees in  and the Kansas City Athletics in .

Early life 
Zeke Bella was born August 22, 1930, in Greenwich, Connecticut. Bella graduated from Greenwich High School in 1947 where he was called "[a] superlative athlete"; playing both football and baseball.

MLB career 
Bella began his professional career with the Class C Amsterdam Rugmakers, a Yankees' fram team, in 1951.

After two years' service in the United States Army during the Korean War, he spent 1954 and 1955 with the Class A Binghamton Triplets, then played from 1956 to 1958 with the Triple-A Denver Bears, the Yankees' top minor league affiliate.

Bella began his major league career on September 11, 1957, with the Yankees, playing in five games and garnering one hit in ten at bats during what would be his only appearances with the Bombers. After spending 1958 with the Bears, he was traded to Kansas City for veteran relief pitcher Murry Dickson on August 22. Bella then played in 47 games for Athletics in 1959. He hit his lone major-league home run on August 13, a two-run shot off Jack Harshman of the Cleveland Indians. He retired from baseball after the 1960 minor-league season.

Over his 52-game MLB career, Bella had 18 hits in 92 at-bats, with a .196 batting average.

Awards and honors 
Bella was inducted into the Greenwich High School Sports Hall of Fame in 2013.

Death 
Zeke Bella died on November 17, 2013, from complications due to a stroke, and the injuries received from a fall it induced; Bella was aged 83 years when he succumbed.

References

External links 

Zeke Bella Stats. baseball-almanac.com. Retrieved December 15, 2013.

1930 births
2013 deaths
Amsterdam Rugmakers players
Baseball players from Connecticut
Binghamton Triplets players
Charleston Senators players
Dallas Rangers players
Denver Bears players
Kansas City Athletics players
Major League Baseball outfielders
New York Yankees players
Shreveport Sports players
Sportspeople from Greenwich, Connecticut